The M54 is a short metropolitan route in Johannesburg, South Africa.

Route 
The M54 begins at the M7 and ends at the M14.

References 

Streets and roads of Johannesburg
Metropolitan routes in Johannesburg